Din Dahade  is a 1990 Bollywood film directed by Mohan Segal, starring Sunil Puri, Kamran Rizvi, Sriprada, Ajit Vachani, Kunika Lall, Vikram Gokhale, Goga Kapoor  and Anil Kochar.

Soundtrack

External links

1990 films
1990s Hindi-language films